Jung Hyo-jung (Hangul: 정효정; ; born January 26, 1984) is a South Korean épée fencer.

Biography
Jung first drew attention at the 2002 World Junior Fencing Championships where she won a bronze medal in the women's individual épée. Jung won the individual épée gold medal at the 2010 Asian Fencing Championships, defeating Luo Xiaojuan of China 4–3 in the final. Jung also captured her first World Championship medal in the women's épée team event at the 2010 World Fencing Championships, leading the team alongside Shin A-lam.

She competed at the 2012 Summer Olympics, where she won a silver medal in the Women's team épée. In the individual event she was defeated in the second round.

References

External links

South Korean female épée fencers
Living people
Olympic fencers of South Korea
Fencers at the 2008 Summer Olympics
Fencers at the 2012 Summer Olympics
Olympic silver medalists for South Korea
Olympic medalists in fencing
1984 births
Medalists at the 2012 Summer Olympics
Asian Games medalists in fencing
Fencers at the 2006 Asian Games
Fencers at the 2010 Asian Games
Asian Games silver medalists for South Korea
Asian Games bronze medalists for South Korea
Medalists at the 2006 Asian Games
Medalists at the 2010 Asian Games